Toxteth by-election may refer to:

 1895 Liverpool East Toxteth by-election
 1902 Liverpool East Toxteth by-election
 1916 Liverpool East Toxteth by-election
 1929 Liverpool East Toxteth by-election
 1931 Liverpool East Toxteth by-election
 1935 Liverpool West Toxteth by-election

See also
 Liverpool East Toxteth (UK Parliament constituency)
 Liverpool West Toxteth (UK Parliament constituency)
 Liverpool Toxteth (UK Parliament constituency)